Modern Art is an album by trumpeter Art Farmer featuring performances recorded in 1958 and originally released on the United Artists label.

Reception

The 1958 Down Beat review gave the album a maximum five stars. The Allmusic review stated: "Modern Art is the prelude recording for Art Farmer prior to his partnership in the Jazztet with Benny Golson, and also foreshadows the classy, tasteful inventiveness that group brought to the modern jazz world two years after this 1958 session... the Farmer-Golson combine proved to be a[n] important pairing beyond their initial partnership, with the seeds of that forest flower heard and enjoyed here". The Penguin Guide to Jazz described it as "one of Farmer's most successful records of the period", praising the contributions of pianist Bill Evans in particular.

Track listing
 "Mox Nix" (Art Farmer) – 4:39     
 "Fair Weather" (Benny Golson) – 5:42     
 "Darn That Dream" (Eddie DeLange, Jimmy Van Heusen) – 3:57     
 "The Touch of Your Lips" (Ray Noble) – 4:52     
 "Jubilation" (Junior Mance) – 4:15     
 "Like Someone in Love" (Johnny Burke, Van Heusen) – 5:55     
 "I Love You" (Cole Porter) – 6:58     
 "Cold Breeze" (Wade Legge) – 3:53

Personnel
Art Farmer – trumpet
Benny Golson – tenor saxophone
Bill Evans – piano
Addison Farmer – bass
Dave Bailey – drums

References 

United Artists Records albums
Art Farmer albums
1958 albums